Stupinsky District is an administrative and municipal district (raion), one of the thirty-six in Moscow Oblast, Russia. It is located in the south of the oblast. Its administrative center is the town of Stupino. Population: 119,282 (2010 Census);  The population of Stupino accounts for 56.0% of the district's total population.

As of 2016, the district had the fourth lowest crime rate in Moscow Oblast, behind Baikonur, Vlasikha, and Dubna.

References

Notes

Sources

Districts of Moscow Oblast